David Whissell, BEng (born September 1, 1967) is a Canadian politician, businessman, engineer and former Quebec cabinet minister.

Born in Montreal, Whissell received a bachelor's degree in civil engineering from the École polytechnique de Montréal in 1990. He worked as an engineer at Whissell Inc., in Lachute, and became the president and owner of Beton 344 Inc. in Saint-André-d'Argenteuil near Lachute, and the president and vice-president of the Chamber of Commerce of Lachute.

Prior to his entry into provincial politics, he was the president of the Liberal Party of Canada association in the Argenteuil region. He was later the member for Argenteuil in the National Assembly of Quebec as a member of the Quebec Liberal Party. He was first elected in a by-election on June 1, 1998, and was re-elected in the general elections held on November 30, 1998 and April 14, 2003. When the Liberals regained power he was named the Parliamentary secretary to Jean Charest. In 2005, after a Cabinet shuffle, he would become the Chair of the Government Caucus and member responsible for the Laurentians.

Whissell was the only Liberal member to be re-elected in the Laurentides region in the 2007 elections. He was named Minister of Labour and the Minister responsible for the Abitibi-Témiscamingue, Laurentides and Lanaudière regions.

He resigned from the Cabinet on September 9, 2009 following a conflict of interest related to a company in which he owned shares. According to a local newspaper, the company, ABC Rive-Nord, specialized in asphalt making and received multiple contracts without call for bids from the Ministry of Transportation.

He resigned his seat in the National Assembly on December 16, 2011, citing family reasons and a desire to focus on his business career.

He lives with Francine Vaillancourt and is the father of two children, Justine and Philippe.

Electoral record

References

1967 births
Businesspeople from Montreal
Canadian civil engineers
Living people
People from Lachute
Politicians from Montreal
Quebec Liberal Party MNAs
21st-century Canadian politicians